John Anthony Mercado Cuero (born 3 June 2002) is an Ecuadorian footballer who plays as a winger for Portuguese club Vilafranquense.

Club career
Born in Guayaquil, Mercado agreed to a contract with Athletico Paranaense in July 2019, but only moved to his new side in August 2020, after his 18th birthday. After playing for the under-20s, he impressed manager Alberto Valentim in 2022, and was promoted to the first team squad.

Mercado made his professional debut on 2 March 2022, coming on as a second-half substitute for Léo Cittadini in a 0–2 away loss against Palmeiras, for the year's Recopa Sudamericana.

International career
Mercado represented Ecuador at under-15 level in the 2017 South American U-15 Championship, and at under-17 level in the 2019 South American U-17 Championship and the 2019 FIFA U-17 World Cup.

Career statistics

References

External links
Athletico Paranaense profile 

2002 births
Living people
People from Guayaquil
Ecuadorian footballers
Association football wingers
Campeonato Brasileiro Série A players
Campeonato Brasileiro Série B players
Liga Portugal 2 players
Club Athletico Paranaense players
Centro Sportivo Alagoano players
U.D. Vilafranquense players
Ecuadorian expatriate footballers
Ecuadorian expatriate sportspeople in Brazil
Ecuadorian expatriate sportspeople in Portugal
Expatriate footballers in Brazil
Expatriate footballers in Portugal